ROKS Suncheon (PCC-767) was a  of the Republic of Korea Navy. It was decommissioned and transferred to the Peruvian Navy as BAP Guise (CC-28).

Development and design 

The Pohang class is a series of corvettes built by different Korean shipbuilding companies. The class consists of 24 ships and some after decommissioning were sold or given to other countries. There are five different types of designs in the class from Flight II to Flight VI.

Construction and career 
Suncheon was launched on 8 April 1987 by Hanjin Heavy Industries in Busan. The vessel was commissioned on 30 September 1988 and decommissioned on 24 December 2019. 

The ship was transferred to Peru in 2021 and was commissioned in January 2022 as the BAP Guise.

On 17 July 2022, two sailors were critically injured after a fire broke out in the engine room of the Guise while the ship was participating in the 2022 RIMPAC exercise. The fire was extinguished and the injured sailors were transferred to Honolulu for medical treatment.

References
 

Ships built by Hanjin Heavy Industries
Pohang-class corvettes
1987 ships